Bungalow Town Halt was a small railway station in what is now Shoreham Beach, West Sussex.  Bungalow Town had started in the 1870s as a series of converted railway carriages on the shingle spit shielding the River Adur..It was opened in 1910 and closed at the start of 1933. The station reopened as Shoreham Airport on 1 July 1935, serving Shoreham Airport to the north of the railway line until 15 July 1940.

Services

References

Disused railway stations in West Sussex
Former London, Brighton and South Coast Railway stations
Railway stations in Great Britain opened in 1910
Railway stations in Great Britain closed in 1933
Railway stations in Great Britain opened in 1935
Railway stations in Great Britain closed in 1940